Fabrizio Carafa (1588 – March, 1651) was a Roman Catholic prelate who served as Bishop of Bitonto (1622–1651).

Biography
Fabrizio Carafa was born in Naples, Italy in 1588. On 24 January 1622, he was appointed during the papacy of Pope Gregory XV as Bishop of Bitonto. On 6 February 1622, he was consecrated bishop by Francesco Sacrati (cardinal), Cardinal-Priest of San Matteo in Merulana, with Alfonso Giglioli, Bishop of Anglona-Tursi, and Carlo Bovi, Bishop of Bagnoregio, serving as co-consecrators. He served as Bishop of Bitonto until his death in March 1651.

See also 
Catholic Church in Italy

References

External links and additional sources
 (for Chronology of Bishops)
 (for Chronology of Bishops)

17th-century Italian Roman Catholic bishops
Bishops appointed by Pope Gregory XV
1588 births
1651 deaths
Bishops of Bitonto